Vijaya Naarasimha (ಕನ್ನಡ:ವಿಜಯ ನಾರಸಿಂಹ)(16th January 1927 – 31 October 2001) was an Indian lyricist who worked in Kannada cinema.

Career
Vijaya Naarasimha's first Kannada film song was "Yee Dehadinda Dooranaade" (Oh soul, why did you depart this body) for the 1956 film Ohileshwara. He was part of the magic trio of director S. R. Puttanna Kanagal and music director Vijaya Bhaskar, which came up with widely appreciated songs.

He worked with every major singer and music director through the 60s, 70s and 80s and with every major actor, including a couple of Kannada films with Tamil superstar Rajnikanth. His last film was the Rajkumar-starrer Odahuttidavaru. He was always writing, though his eyesight was bad, it was a passion with him. According to his family, even three days before his death, he was writing devotional songs on lord Rama for a cassette. Other than nearly 4,000 film songs, he wrote three novels: Badukina Bairagi, Srimanchakrayana and Sanjegempu, and also Puttanna Kanagal's biography and lyrics for countless devotional cassettes. His cassette bhadrapada shuklada chauti sold a record number of copies 30 years ago. He also holds the unique distinction of writing Kannada song for a Tamil movie in M.G. Ramachandran's Tamil classic Nadodi Mannan (1958).

Filmography
 Kallu Sakkare (1967)
 Bevarina Bele (1968)
 Mallammana Pavada (1969)
 Uyyale (1969)
 Shara Panjara (1971)
 Baalu Belagithu (1972)
 Hrudaya Sangama (1972)
 Naagara Haavu (1972)
 Nandagokula (1972)
 Belagidesose (1973)
 Bilee Hendthi (1975)
Bhagyajyothi (1975)
 Shubha Mangala (1975)
 Kathaa Sangama (1975)
 Besuge (1976)
 Chiranjeevi (1976)
 Phalithaamsha (1976)
 Teerada Bayake (1976)
 Deepa (1977)
 Adalu Badalu (1978)
 Amrutha Ghalige (1983)
 Aparanji (1983)
 Dharanimandala Madhyadolage (1983)
 Bankar Margayya (1983)
 Akashavani (1985)
 Giri Mallige (1988)
 Bisilu Beladingalu (1988)
 Odahuttidavaru (1994)

Selected songs 
 Neene saakida Gini from Manasasarovara
 Nannalli Ekinthu Ananda Kaane Manase Nee Balleya Sukhava from Kallu Sakkare
 Bharata Bhooshira Mandira Sundari from Upasane
 Ee Sambhashane from Dharmasere
 Ee Sarigamada Sundari from Kallu veene midiyithu.
 Hindustanavu Endoo Mareyada from Amrutha Ghalige
 Gandarva Giriyali Neevu from Gandarvagiri
 Mandara Pushpavu Neenu from Ranganayaki
 Masanada Hoovendu from Masanada Hoovu
 Mayuri Naatya Mayuri from Amrutha Ghalige
 Nammibale Rasamaya Kaavya from Naaga Naga Kala Bhairava
 O Gunavantha from Masanada Hoovu
 Panchama Veda Premada Nada from Gejje Pooje
 Viraha Nooru Taraha from Edakallu Guddada Mele
 Maguve Ninna Hoo Nage from Gejje Pooje
 Rangeri Banthu from Avala Neralu

References 

1927 births
2001 deaths
Kannada film score composers
Kannada-language lyricists
Indian male songwriters
Kannada poets
20th-century Indian composers
20th-century Indian poets
Musicians from Bangalore
Film musicians from Karnataka
Screenwriters from Bangalore
Poets from Karnataka
Indian male poets
20th-century Indian male writers
Male film score composers
20th-century male musicians
20th-century Indian screenwriters